Avachinsky (also known as Avacha or Avacha Volcano or Avachinskaya Sopka) is an active stratovolcano in Russia. It is situated on the Kamchatka Peninsula in the Russian Far East. Avachinsky lies within sight of Petropavlovsk-Kamchatsky, the capital of Kamchatka Krai. Together with neighbouring Koryaksky volcano, it has been designated a Decade Volcano, worthy of particular study in light of its history of explosive eruptions and proximity to populated areas.

Avachinsky's last eruption occurred in 2008. This eruption was tiny compared to the volcano's major Volcanic Explosivity Index 4 eruption in 1945.

Geological history
Avachinsky lies on the Pacific Ring of Fire, at a point where the Pacific Plate is sliding underneath the Eurasian Plate at a rate of about /year. A wedge of mantle material lying between the subducting Pacific Plate and the overlying Eurasian Plate is the source of dynamic volcanism over the whole Kamchatka Peninsula.

The volcano is one of the most active volcanoes on the Kamchatka Peninsula, and began erupting in the middle to late Pleistocene era. Reconstruction of a new cone inside the caldera occurred in two major eruption phases, 18,000 and 7,000 years ago.

Recorded history
In his Journal of Captain Cook's Last Voyage, John Ledyard records the eruption of Avachinsky on 15 June 1779.  He refers to Koryaksky and Avachinsky as Peter and Paul.

Recent activity

Avachinsky has erupted at least 16 times in recorded history. Eruptions have generally been explosive, and pyroclastic flows and lahars have tended to be directed to the south west by the breached caldera. The volcano has since had small eruptions in 1991 and 2001.

The volcano continues to experience frequent earthquakes, and many fumaroles exist near the summit. In light of its proximity to Petropavlovsk-Kamchatsky, Avachinsky was designated a Decade Volcano in 1996 as part of the United Nations' International Decade for Natural Disaster Reduction, together with the nearby Koryaksky volcano.

See also

List of volcanoes in Russia

References

External links
  VolcanoWorld information

Active volcanoes
Decade Volcanoes
Volcanoes of the Kamchatka Peninsula
Mountains of the Kamchatka Peninsula
VEI-4 volcanoes
Calderas of Russia
Stratovolcanoes of Russia
Holocene stratovolcanoes
Holocene Asia
Pleistocene stratovolcanoes